Mary Katharine Ham (born April 5, 1980) is an American journalist. She is a contributing editor for Townhall Magazine, a writer at The Federalist, and a CNN contributor. She previously worked as a Fox News contributor and an editor-at-large for Hot Air.

Career
Ham wrote for the Richmond County Daily Journal, Townhall.com where she was a columnist and managing editor, and The Washington Examiner. Her video blog series for Townhall.com, HamNation, won a Golden Dot award for Best Vlog of 2006 from the Institute for Politics, Democracy & the Internet and her HamNation video, "Sopranos DC," was voted "Video of the Year" in the 2007 Weblog Awards. The series ended in June 2008.

Ham was a host of The Morning Majority (5–9 a.m., Monday–Friday) on WMAL (simulcast on 105.9 FM and 630 AM) in Washington, D.C., until March 5, 2012.

Ham describes her political leaning as "primarily fiscal- and security-conscious conservative".

At the 2014 Conservative Political Action Conference, she was presented with the American Conservative Union Blogger of the Year award.

In October 2022, Ham wrote that she had been quietly suspended from work at CNN for seven months after commenting on colleague Jeffrey Toobin's sexual activities while at work.

Personal life
Ham was married to Jacob Brewer, a White House aide. The couple married in 2011; two years later, Ham gave birth to their first child, a girl. Brewer died from serious injuries sustained in a bicycle accident on September 19, 2015. Ham gave birth to their second child, a girl, in late 2015. 

Ham remarried on March 7, 2020, to a man "who has no social media presence". As of February, 2022, Ham has three daughters.

Book
 End of Discussion: How the Left’s Outrage Industry Shuts Down Debate, Manipulates Voters, and Makes America Less Free (and Fun) Hardcover with Guy Benson 2015

References

External links

 
 

Writers from Montgomery, Alabama
Writers from Durham, North Carolina
University of Georgia alumni
The Weekly Standard people
1980 births
Living people
American women bloggers
American bloggers
American women journalists
American editors
American women editors
21st-century American non-fiction writers
21st-century American women writers